The 2002 Winter Olympics Countdown Clock is bronze sculpture installed in the TRAX Arena station in downtown Salt Lake City, Utah, United States. Unveiled on May 15, 2001, to count down to the 2002 Winter Olympics, the clock resembles an arrowhead to commemorate those found during construction of the station.

References

External links

2002 Winter Olympics
Clocks in the United States
Outdoor sculptures in Salt Lake City